Karl or Carl Herman Sätherberg (May 19, 1812 in Botkyrka socken – January 9, 1897 in Stockholm) was a Swedish poet and (orthopedic) physician.

Sätherberg became a medical doctor in 1843 and travelled with the corvette Karlskrona to the Mediterranean 1844–1845. The journey is described in the books Utflykter på hafvet 1-2. In 1847, he succeeded Nils Åkerman as director of the Orthopedic Institute in Stockholm, where he remained until 1879. Sätherberg was very active in the development of Physical therapy in Sweden.

The theme that he was most known for in his poetry was nature, but he also wrote plays and epic poems. His poem Blomsterkonungen, a homage to Carl von Linné, was widely read. He also wrote lyrics for the son of king Oscar I and composer Gustav. He wrote the lyrics for the very popular song Studentsången.

References

1812 births
1897 deaths
Swedish poets
Swedish male writers
Swedish medical writers
Swedish-language writers
Swedish orthopedic surgeons
Swedish male poets
19th-century Swedish poets
19th-century male writers